Garth Neustadter (born May 4, 1986 in Green Bay, Wisconsin) is an American composer and multi-instrumentalist.

Biography 
Neustadter began studying the violin and piano at the age of four, later undertaking saxophone and voice studies. He completed undergraduate degrees in violin and voice performance at Lawrence University and went on to study composition at the Yale School of Music.

In 2007, Neustadter was selected by veteran film composer Hans Zimmer as the winner of the Turner Classic Movies Young Film Composers Competition. He subsequently composed feature-length scores for Turner Classic Movies, Warner Bros., and PBS.

In 2011, Neustadter received a Primetime Emmy Award for his score for the PBS American Masters documentary, "John Muir in the New World".

In 2015, Garth played at the Capitol Civic Centre in Manitowoc in the Garth Neustadter Trio with his mom and dad.

Awards 
 2007 - Winner of the Turner Classic Movies Young Film Composers Competition
 2010 - ASCAP Morton Gould Award recipient
 2011 - Primetime Emmy Award winner for Outstanding Music Composition for a Series
 2011 - ASCAP Young Jazz Composer Award recipient

References

External links 
 Official website
 

1986 births
Living people
Musicians from Green Bay, Wisconsin
American male composers
21st-century American composers
21st-century American singers
21st-century American male singers